Stuart Kirk Inman (August 2, 1926 – January 30, 2007) was an American basketball player, coach and executive.  He was selected in the sixth round of the 1950 NBA Draft from San Jose State University by the Chicago Stags; however, he did not play in the NBA.

Early life and education
Inman played college basketball at San Jose State from 1947 to 1950. As a senior, he averaged 14.9 points.

Coaching career
After graduating from San Jose State, Inman became head coach at Madera High School in Madera, California for a season, then was head coach at Theodore Roosevelt High School in Fresno from 1951 to 1953. He then moved up to the junior college level as head coach at Santa Ana City College from 1953 to 1955, then at Orange Coast Junior College from 1955 to 1957. From 1957 to 1960, Inman was an assistant coach at San Jose State before serving as head coach from 1960 to 1966.

Executive career
In 1970, Inman was one of several people who started the expansion Portland Trail Blazers NBA franchise, and initially served as chief scout. He also served as interim coach at the end of the 1971–72 season, after Rolland Todd was fired midway through the season. Inman played a significant role in the building of Portland Trail Blazers' 1976–77 NBA championship team, acquiring Bill Walton, Geoff Petrie, Larry Steele, Lloyd Neal, Lionel Hollins, Bobby Gross, Wally Walker and Johnny Davis through the draft, signed Dave Twardzik after the American Basketball Association folded, and selected Maurice Lucas in the ABA dispersal draft. Inman later served as the team's general manager from 1981 through 1986.

As the general manager for the Trail Blazers, Inman selected the oft-injured Kentucky center Sam Bowie with the number-two pick in the 1984 NBA Draft, one spot ahead of the Chicago Bulls who selected Michael Jordan. At the time Portland already had shooting guards (Clyde Drexler and Jim Paxson) and were in need of a center. Inman reflected on the move in 1992, telling The Palm Beach Post, "There's really no excuse. [...] I knew Michael Jordan; I spent that summer with Bobby Knight and that Olympic team and I can't say I saw that greatness that would manifest itself."

Inman worked for the Milwaukee Bucks as their director of player personnel from 1986 to 1987. He was the director of player personnel for the Miami Heat from the team's inception in 1987 to 1992. He served as a consultant to Dallas Mavericks head coach Quinn Buckner during the 1993–94 season. He later served as an assistant coach at Lake Oswego High School.

He died at age 80 in Lake Oswego, Oregon of a heart attack.

Head coaching record

College

NBA

|- 
| align="left" |Portland
| align="left" |
|26||6||20|||| 5th in Pacific
|align="center"|–
|align="center"|–
|align="center"|–
|align="center"|–
| align="center"|–
|-class="sortbottom"
| align="left" |Career
| || 26||6||20|||| 
|align="center"|–
|align="center"|–
|align="center"|–
|align="center"|–
| align="center"|–

References

Additional sources

External links
 Basketball-Reference.com: Stu Inman

1926 births
2007 deaths
Place of birth missing
Amateur Athletic Union men's basketball players
American men's basketball coaches
American men's basketball players
Basketball coaches from California
Basketball players from California
Centers (basketball)
Chicago Stags draft picks
High school basketball coaches in California
Junior college men's basketball coaches in the United States
Portland Trail Blazers executives
Portland Trail Blazers head coaches
San Jose State Spartans men's basketball coaches
San Jose State Spartans men's basketball players
Sportspeople from Lake Oswego, Oregon
Sportspeople from Portland, Oregon
Basketball players from Portland, Oregon